Matanga (Mātaṅga ) may refer to:
Hilary Matanga (born 1984), Zimbabwean cricketer
Kasyapa Matanga (fl. 67 CE), Indian Buddhist monk
Matanga (moth), a genus of family Geometridae
Matanga Muni, author of the Brihaddeshi, an early treatise on classical Indian music
Matanga, Madagascar
Matangi, Tantric goddess